Tony Diprose (born 22 September 1972, in Orsett) is a former English rugby union footballer. He played at number 8.

Diprose attended The Campion School, Hornchurch.

Club career
Diprose signed for Harlequins from Saracens in April 2001 and made his début in the pre-season friendly against Bedford at Goldington Road four months later (18 August 2001). Diprose scored his first try for Quins in the Heineken Cup match away to Munster (5 January 2002) and for his efforts over the 2002/03 campaign, he was named 'Supporters Player of the Season.'

Diprose retired at the end of the 2005/06 season and joined the coaching staff at Harlequins as the Academy Manager. As of January 2020 Tony is the head of sport at Canford School.

International career
In 1995/96, Diprose captained England A to an unbeaten season, just 12 months after being voted the RFU Young Player of the Year.

Diprose has won ten full caps for England and has a reputation of being one of the most talented footballing forwards of his generation. He won his first cap against Argentina in 1997 and scored a try. He was also called up to the 1997 British Lions tour to South Africa as an injury replacement for Scott Quinnell.

In 1998, Diprose captained England against  after Matt Dawson was forced to withdraw through injury.

References

External links
 
 Guinness Premiership profile

1972 births
Living people
British & Irish Lions rugby union players from England
England international rugby union players
English rugby union coaches
English rugby union players
Harlequin F.C. players
Loughborough Students RUFC players
Rugby union number eights
Rugby union players from Orsett
Saracens F.C. players